Fontenailles is the name of two communes in France:

 Fontenailles, Seine-et-Marne, in the Seine-et-Marne département
 Fontenailles, Yonne, in the Yonne département